The 2012–13 Elite Ice Hockey League season was the tenth season of the Elite Ice Hockey League. The regular season began on Saturday 8 September 2012 and ended on Sunday 24 March 2013, followed by the Play-Offs which culminated in the end-of-season Play-Off Finals on Saturday 6 and Sunday 7 April 2013.

This season saw the introduction of a new two conference format, in which the ten participating teams were split into two conferences of five teams. The Gardiner Conference, named after former Chicago Blackhawks goaltender Charlie Gardiner, comprised the five northernmost mainland teams (Braehead Clan, Dundee Stars, Edinburgh Capitals, Fife Flyers and Hull Stingrays) and the Erhardt Conference, named after the captain of the British 1936 Winter Olympics gold medal winning team Carl Erhardt, comprised the four southernmost mainland teams (Cardiff Devils, Coventry Blaze, Nottingham Panthers and Sheffield Steelers) and one team from Northern Ireland (Belfast Giants). The most prestigious honour remained the overall League Championship, awarded to the team with the most points gained from all league games (conference and inter-conference games). The season also included the end-of-season Play-Offs and the Challenge Cup.

Nottingham Panthers proved to be the dominant team of the season, clinching the Elite League Championship – their first British League Championship title for 57 years – when they defeated their nearest challengers Belfast Giants 5–3 at the Odyssey Arena on Friday 15 March 2013. However, the Giants would prevent the Panthers achieving a regular season double of League and Conference titles by shading a very close Erhardt Conference title race on regulation time wins after both teams finished level on points. The Gardiner Conference proved even more exciting with all five teams never being more than a few wins apart, at one stage towards the end of the season only one point separating first and last place. Braehead Clan eventually ran out Conference Champions in a very successful first season for the new two-conference format.

The Challenge Cup was won for the fourth successive season by Nottingham Panthers, clinching their second honour of the season by defeating Sheffield Steelers 5–3 on aggregate in the two-legged final. The Panthers then overcame a big scare at the hands of Fife Flyers in the Play-Off Quarter-Finals to defeat Cardiff Devils in the semi-finals and then Belfast Giants 3–2 in overtime in the Final. This third successive Play-Offs victory also gave them the treble of League Championship, Play-Offs and Challenge Cup, the first time the treble has been won since Coventry Blaze's success in 2004–05.

Team information

Regular season
The League Championship was played for over 52 games, each team playing teams in their own conference eight times (four home and four away) and teams in the other conference four times (two home and two away).

The Conference Championships were played for over 32 games, each team playing teams in their own conference eight times (four home and four away).

Teams were awarded two points for a win (in regulation time, overtime or shoot-out), one point for a tie (in regulation time but loss in overtime or shoot-out) and no points for a loss (in regulation time). Teams level on points were separated by (1) total number of games won in regulation time, (2) total number of all games won, (3) results between teams or (4) fewest losses.

The top eight teams in the League Championship qualified for the Play-Offs.

Results

Grid Colours: Blue = league & conference games; Pink = league games.

Result Colours: Black = regulation time result; Green = overtime result; Red = shoot-out result.

League Standings

Conference standings

Gardiner Conference

Erhardt Conference

Team Records

Play-Offs
The quarter-finals were played over two legs, home and away. The semi-finals and Final were played over a single leg at a neutral venue, the National Ice Centre, in the 'Play-Off Finals Weekend'.

The Play-Off seeds were (1) Nottingham Panthers, (2) Belfast Giants, (3) Braehead Clan, (4) Sheffield Steelers, (5) Coventry Blaze, (6) Cardiff Devils, (7) Edinburgh Capitals and (8) Fife Flyers (in order of League Champions, best Conference Champions, second best Conference Champions, final League Championship positions respectively).

Quarter-finals

Semi-finals

3rd Place Play-Off

Final

Challenge Cup
The First Round comprised two groups of five teams, each team playing teams in their own group twice (once home and once away), totalling eight games.

In the First Round group games, teams were awarded two points for a win (in regulation time, overtime or shoot-out), one point for a tie (in regulation time but loss in overtime or shoot-out) and no points for a loss (in regulation time). Teams level on points were separated by (1) total number of games won in regulation time, (2) total number of all games won, (3) results between teams or (4) fewest losses.

The top four teams from each First Round group qualified for the quarter-finals. The quarter-final ties were decided by final group positions (A1-B4, B1-A4, A2-B3, B2-A3). The quarter-finals, semi-finals and Final were all played over two legs, home and away.

Due to scheduling constraints, some League Championship games doubled up as Challenge Cup games.

First round

Group A

 (All Group Game results by date)

Result Colours: Black = regulation time result; Green = overtime result; Red = shoot-out result.

Group B

 (All Group Game results by date)

Result Colours: Black = regulation time result; Green = overtime result; Red = shoot-out result.

Quarter-finals

Semi-finals

Final

Player statistics

Regular season

Play-Offs

Season Awards

Individual awards

All-Star Teams

References

External links
 Elite Ice Hockey League Official Site
 EIHL Highlights Show on YouTube
 Hockeystats Elite League
 British Ice Hockey
 Ice Hockey UK
 BBC Sport Ice Hockey
 Sky Sports Ice Hockey
 Hockey Database

Elite Ice Hockey League seasons
1
United